Linda R. S. v. Richard D., 410 U.S. 614 (1973), was a United States Supreme Court case resulting in a ruling that a particular section of a Texas Penal Code did not apply to mothers with out-of-wedlock children. The case was argued on December 6, 1972 and decided on March 5, 1973. Linda R. S., the petitioner and appellant, was the mother of the out of wedlock child. Richard D., the respondent and appellee, was the father of the out of wedlock child.

Facts
Linda R. S., the mother of an out of wedlock child, brought an action to enjoin the "discriminatory application" of Art. 602 of the Texas Penal Code, providing that any "parent" who fails to support his "children" is subject to prosecution but by state judicial construction applies only to married parents. Linda R. S. sought to enjoin the local district attorney from refraining to prosecute the father of her child for not providing child support. The three-judge District Court dismissed the action for lack of standing.

Decision
The Supreme Court affirmed the District Court's holding in a 5–4 decision. Justice Thurgood Marshall wrote the majority opinion, joined by Chief Justice Warren E. Burger and Justices Lewis F. Powell, Jr., Potter Stewart, and William Rehnquist. The Court held that "although appellant has an interest in her child's support, application of Art. 602 would not result in support but only in the father's incarceration, and a private citizen lacks a judicially cognizable interest in the prosecution or nonprosecution of another." In December 1981, in Leeke v. Timmerman, the Supreme Court affirmed the precedent in Linda R. S. v. Richard D..

Justice White's dissent 
Justice White, with Justice Douglas joining, wrote that "children born out of wedlock ... have been excluded intentionally from the class of persons protected by a particular criminal law. They do not get the protection of the laws that other women and children get. Under Art. 602, they are rendered nonpersons; a father may ignore them with full knowledge that he will be subjected to no penal sanctions."

Justice Blackmun's dissent 
Justice Blackmun, with Justice Brennan joining, saw "no reason to decide that question in the absence of a live, ongoing controversy because of Gomez v. Perez, 409 U.S. 535 (1973)."

See also
 List of United States Supreme Court cases, volume 410
 Levy v. Louisiana: Supreme Court case involving malpractice by children out of wedlock

References

Further reading

External links
 

United States Supreme Court cases
United States Supreme Court cases of the Burger Court
1973 in United States case law
Legitimacy law
Legal history of Texas
Child support